Stig Herman Hästö (19 March 1918 – 14 September 1997) was a Finnish jurist, businessman and vuorineuvos.

Hästö was born in Pori, but his family moved to Viipuri soon after. After the early death of his father, his mother worked hard as an entrepreneur to provide for her family.  The Second World War interrupted Hästö's studies; he was wounded in the Karelian isthmus in 1944. He graduated as jurist in 1946.

Hästö worked as delegate for employers' association STK in 1948–1957.

In 1957 Hästö started working for the textile company Finlayson and became the company manager in 1962. Despite the board's resistance to change, he modernized the company to meet the challenges of free trade. New problems came during recession in the 1970s.

Hästö left Finlayson and went again to work for the employers' association in 1979, when he was selected manager of TKL. While the work was easy due to good times, Hästö fell in an uncomfortable situation during presidential elections of 1982, when a large part of the association supported Ahti Karjalainen for president, while Hästö tried to remain neutral.

Hästö retired in 1983 after which he worked in some international positions of trust and foreign trade. For instance, his trip to Atlanta during this time helped establish a foothold for Finnish companies to get established there, especially in the pulp and paper industry. He wrote his memoirs and a book about summer 1944 in Viipuri.

Childhood, war years and studies 
Hästö's Swedish-speaking father, manager Mats Hästö had roots in Ostrobothnia and the Finnish-speaking mother Ellen née Grönroos was from Satakunta. The family settled in Viipuri after the Finnish Civil War. The father died already in 1923 after which the widowed mother could afford a decent living standard for the family and education for the three sons through hard work by running her own café.

However, the Winter War interrupted Hästö's law studies. He was promoted officer in the Continuation War and served in the Finnish Armoured Division. During the trench warfare stage he continued his studies. In 1944 he took part in Battle of Kuuterselkä and was severely wounded in the Tali. He studied during his convalescence and graduated in 1946.

Delegate in STK 
For a short time Hästö worked as lawyer, but in 1948 he started as delegate in the Finnish Engineering Industry Employers' Association. Hästö was familiar with negotiations between the employers' association and trade unions during the post-war turbulent years. By time Hästö, who was grown in rather conservative environment, learnt understanding the opponents' point of view and appreciate many union leaders. Hästö had disputes with Väinö Karikoski, the manager of Finnish Employers' Central Association (STK), because he could not stand Karikoski's management style.

Finlayson 
Hästö aimed to management of a large company. He received many offers, but was selective, until in 1957 he was appointed Deputy Manager in textile producer Finlayson. The area was new to Hästö, and he went through a thorough introduction given by Sadi Sandell, the long-term manager of the company, and travelled to United States for excursion.

While Finlayson was an old and financially stable company and also a highly considered brand, Hästö saw its future uncertain; the company's position relied on high import tariffs and a domestic cartel. He realised that the position was on an unsustainable basis due to development towards free trade. The company needed modernisation, but when Hästö was appointed manager in 1962, he proceeded carefully. The board chairmen, first Sandell and followed by Emil Aaltonen and Lauri J. Kivekäs, resisted changes. Hästö diversified the portfolio according to the contemporary management trend. After Finland signed associate membership agreement with EFTA in the 1960s, the company managed to maintain its position in the domestic market and increase exports through modern design. The company's plastic production was increased substantially. A drawback came through two mergers in which Finlayson first took over a cotton company in Vaasa, then another one in Pori. Both units were unprofitable but Hästö's critical views became overrun by the Finlayson owners, who wanted the acquisition.

Finlaysen fell into problems during the oil crisis of 1973. Hästö blamed unfavourable Soviet trade agreements which were signed under pressure by Finnish officials. On the other hand, cotton industry had faced difficulties everywhere in the western world due to intense competition. Hästö modernised the organisation structure dividing it into independent units according to product categories, but this did not bring the desired results. In 1976 Hästö started to be again increasingly involved in employers' associations, and became selected STK chairman in 1976, although he resisted his nomination at first. Although the new role presumably limited his possibilities at focusing on overcoming problems which Finlayson experienced at the time, the company started to recover. Hästö left the Finlayson manager position in 1978 after which he still worked as chairman of the board until 1979.

TKL manager 
The 1975 founded Central Association of Industry (TKL) suffered of internal wrangling. Hästö mediated the disagreements successfully, and when the TKL manager Timo Laatunen left, Hästö became selected to his place in 1979. The time during his management was easy; the recession of the 1970s was overcome and Soviet export was still running well. By time Hästö established relations with president Urho Kekkonen. When Kekkonen resigned in 1981, some industrial leaders wanted to promote Ahti Karjalainen as his replacement because he was believed to guarantee the Soviet trade which was vital for the country, and sought for support from TKL. Although Hästö took a neutral and reserved approach, he did not resist joint statement of TKL which was given as indirect support to Karjalainen. Eventually, Mauno Koivisto from SDP became selected the president in the 1982 elections. The TKL statement weakened the association's relationship to social democrats.

At the end of his term investigated possibilities for improving co-operation between STK and TKL and he suggested merging the two associations. This took place just later, in the 1990s. Hästö suggested also other changes, but his achievements remained modest in TKL. He retired from his position in 1983.

Later years 
After his retirement Hästö held some positions of trust in Unice and Business and Industry Advisory Committee (BIAC) of OECD. Completely bilingual Hästö wrote his memoirs both in Finnish and Swedish. He also wrote a book about summer 1944 events in city of Viipuri.

Personal life 
In 1944 Hästö married Gunvor née Gräsbeck. The couple had two sons and a daughter born in 1947, 1948 and 1951. After his divorce, Hästö had Mary Botschmanoff née Indrenius-Zalewski as a long-time partner.

Bibliography 
  In Swedish: Från Pehrsgatan 6 till Champs Elysées – självbiografiska berättelser från sju decennier. .
  In Swedish: Farväl Wiborg – minnen och verklighet då Wiborgs öde beseglades. .

References 

1918 births
1997 deaths
Finnish business executives